This is a list of parkways and named highways in Kentucky. Most parkways also carry an unsigned 9000-series designation.



List by name

Kentucky Parkway System

Other named parkways/highways

List by designation
All designations are unsigned.

External links
Kentucky Transportation Cabinet - Division of Planning

Parkway